Huibert Victor Quispel (3 June 1906 – 2 May 1995) was a Dutch naval officer. During World War II, he was the director of the Netherlands Indies Government Information Service based in Australia – the service was established as an intelligence-gathering and propaganda organisation during the Japanese occupation of the Dutch East Indies, and after the war, the Indonesian National Revolution.

In 1960, Quispel wrote The Job and the Tools, one of only two English language histories of the Royal Netherlands Navy.

References

Bibliography 
 

1906 births
1995 deaths
Dutch writers
Military personnel from Amsterdam
Royal Netherlands Navy officers